The 1995 Shreveport Pirates season was the second season in the teams franchise history and would also prove to be the last. They finished last place in the South Division with a 5–13 record and again failed to make the playoffs.

Preseason

Regular season

Season standings

Season schedule

References

Shreveport Pirates
Canadian Football League seasons
Shrev